Richard Gervays (died c. 1410), of Canterbury, Kent, was an English politician.

Family
Gervays was married to a woman named Margery, and they had one son.

Career
Gervays was a Member of Parliament for Canterbury, Kent in 1393 and January 1397.

References

Year of birth missing
1410 deaths
14th-century births
English MPs 1393
People from Canterbury
English MPs January 1397